"Megamix" is a 1988 single by German band Boney M. The single peaked at #1 in the French charts and was a minor success in the UK where it peaked at #52. The megamix is a medley of remixed Boney M. hits, "Rivers of Babylon", "Sunny", "Daddy Cool" and "Rasputin", the 12" version being extended with "Ma Baker" and "Gotta Go Home".

The B-side of the German single, a remix of the group's 1978 hit "Rasputin", was issued as an A-side in the UK where the Megamix was backed with a remix of their 1978 chart-topper "Mary's Boy Child - Oh My Lord".

Releases

Germany
 7" single  / Hansa Records 111 973-100, 1988
 "Megamix" (radio edit) - 3:54 
 "Rasputin" (remix '88 - radio edit) - 4:08

 12" maxi / Hansa Records 611 973-213, 1988
 "Megamix" (extended version) - 7:02
 "Rasputin" (remix '88) - 5:25
 "Megamix" (radio edit) - 3:54

 CD maxi / Hansa Records 661 973-211, 1988
 "Megamix" (extended version) - 7:02 
 "Rasputin" (remix '88) - 5:25
 "Megamix" (radio edit) - 3:54

UK
 7" single / Ariola Records 111 947, 1988
 "Megamix" (radio edit) - 3:54
 "Mary's Boy Child/Oh My Lord" (remix '88) - 4:22

 7" single / Ariola Records 112 096, 1989
 "Rasputin" (remix '88 - radio edit) - 4:08
 "Megamix" (radio edit) - 3:54

 12" single / Ariola Records 611 947 BB, 1988
 "Megamix" (extended version) - 7:02
 "Rivers of Babylon" (remix '88) - 3:40
 "Mary's Boy Child/Oh My Lord" (remix '88) - 4:22

 12" single / Ariola Records 612 096 BB, 1989
 "Rasputin" (remix '88) - 5:25
 "Megamix" (extended version) - 7:02

Charts

Peak positions

Year-end charts

Certifications

References

Rateyourmusic.com

1988 songs
1989 singles
Boney M. songs
Music medleys
SNEP Top Singles number-one singles
Hansa Records singles